Global policeman (or world police) is an informal term for a superpower which seeks or claims the right to intervene in other sovereign states. It has been used, firstly for the United Kingdom and, since 1945, for the United States, though it has been suggested that China has been seeking to take over the role in the 21st century.

The two terms hegemon and global policeman are not identical in meaning. The former term defines capacity for dominant control anywhere on earth, whereas the latter may also include small or large areas outside control, along with monitoring and attempted enforcements, but does not define any level of effectiveness.

In international law

No formal recognition of this position exists. Theoretically, in international law, all nations are equal; 'par in parem non habet imperium', no authority between equals, is the principle applied, although, in reality some states are relatively more powerful than others. States are 'immortal' and cannot be indicted.

Comparison with state policing

Within states, law restrains and limits power; between states, the opposite is true.

The Peelian principles of policing include: the duty to prevent crime, keep the peace and uphold the law, with the consent of the public, and with minimal use of force and restraint; to act impartially; and not to usurp the powers of the judiciary. The latter standard requires a presumption of innocence. Candidates for police recruitment and promotion are appointed on merit, whereas a 'global policeman' is self-appointed faute de mieux.

Within states, a monopoly on violence is the norm; the police may carry weapons, but few others do so (the US is an exception, prompting Charles Lane to ask if it is 'really a state') Internationally, a 'global policeman' is but one heavily armed state among two hundred others.

To confer the  role of 'global policeman' on any self-interested, expansionary state implies a conflict of interest. States wage war with maximum force; engage in arms sales; form alliances and thus lack impartiality.

History

The UK made efforts to end the Slave trade through the West Africa Squadron In 1827, Britain, jointly with France and Russia, intervened on the side of Greek independence, destroying the Turkish fleet at the Battle of Navarino. In 1854, Britain, jointly with France, prevented Russia from destroying the Ottoman Empire. Russia had to withdraw from Moldavia and Wallachia, and Sevastopol was besieged in the Crimean war.

From 1914–1945 no one state was hegemonic, with Britain's power decreasing, but still very much a leading, world role, and with rising powers such as the United States, the Empire of Japan, and later Nazi Germany and the Soviet Union. In an era of multipolarity and diffused responsibility, fascist dictators arose and Europe sank into two world wars. according to Richard J Evans, "The authoritarian German challenge to democratic Britain then, is comparable to the authoritarian Chinese challenge to democratic America now.".

Between the years 1945 and 1990, the world trade was dominated by the Soviet Union and the United States in what was known to be the Cold War.

The Truman Doctrine of 1947 promised assistance to anti-communist allies. "The right of neutrality was abolished... it was an era of aggressive peacetime policy which marked the beginning of America's role as global policeman." Since the end of the Cold War "The enemy is terrorism not communism". But after a disastrous intervention in Somalia in 1993, the US was reluctant to engage in humanitarian intervention in Bosnia and Rwanda.

The US-led Invasion of Iraq, officially a policing mission to find Weapons of Mass Destruction, was, according to some, an illegal cover for ulterior, unethical motives: the need to secure US regional bases, oil supplies, and the loyalty of key allies.

Since then, serious doubts have been raised about the validity of US overseas intervention and destabilization in Iraq, Libya and Syria. As the 21st century progresses, the morality of global policing itself is increasingly in question, with the inevitable loss of self-determination by nations in which intervention occurs. Furthermore, with the advent of non-state threats to global security, prior legal justifications such as general "laws of war" are of questionable jurisdiction.

See also
 Four Policemen
 Hegemony
 International law
 Non-Aligned Movement
 Pax Britannica and Pax Americana
 Peelian principles
 Polarity (international relations)
 Power politics
 Superpower collapse
 Thucydides Trap
 World peace
 World government
Team America: World Police, a 2004 American film that satirises the concept
Interpol

References

Further reading
 Bokat-Lindell, Spencer. "Is the United States Done Being the World’s Cop? The New York Times July 20, 2021
 Knotter, Lucas. "Contemporary Humanitarian Intervention: Beyond Rules-Based International Order." Human Rights in War (2020) pp: 1-22.
 Seybolt, Taylor B. Humanitarian military intervention: the conditions for success and failure (SIPRI Publication, 2007). online
 Tomorrow, the World: The Birth of U.S. Global Supremacy (Harvard UP, 2020),focus on 1940-1945
 Wertheim, Stephen. "A solution from hell: the United States and the rise of humanitarian interventionism, 1991–2003" Journal of Genocide Research (2010)  12:3-4, 149-172, DOI: 10.1080/14623528.2010.522053

Politics
International law